Östmark is a locality situated in Torsby Municipality, Värmland County, Sweden with 216 inhabitants in 2010.

Climate
Östmark has a climate that in recent decades has leaned towards a humid continental climate (Dfb), that formerly was a mild subarctic type (Dfc). The highest recorded temperature is 33.1 °C (91.6 °F) on July 27, 2018 and the lowest is -34.0 °C (-29.2 °F) on February 9, 1966.

References 

Populated places in Torsby Municipality
Värmland